Southgate was a local government district of Middlesex from 1881 to 1965. It was part of the London postal district and Metropolitan Police District.

Incorporation and development
The area was historically part of the parish of Edmonton, which adopted the Public Health Act 1848 and formed a local board of health to govern the area in 1850. In 1879 the ratepayers of Southgate petitioned for their area to be separated from Edmonton, and in 1881 Southgate Local Board was established, with nine members.

It was created an urban district in 1894, under the Local Government Act 1894. The urban district council was increased in size to 12 councillors in 1900. In 1933 Southgate was granted a charter of incorporation and became a municipal borough. The corporation of the borough consisted of a mayor, seven aldermen and twenty-one councillors.

In 1965, the municipal borough was abolished and its former area transferred to Greater London under the London Government Act 1963. Its former area was combined with that of the Municipal Borough of Enfield and the Municipal Borough of Edmonton to form the present-day London Borough of Enfield.

The borough included Southgate itself as well as neighbouring areas Palmers Green, Winchmore Hill, Arnos Grove, New Southgate, and parts of Oakwood, Cockfosters, Bounds Green and Bowes Park. The borough was administered from Southgate Town Hall, which is situated on Green Lanes in Palmers Green, close to the junction with Broomfield Lane.

Coat of arms
The town was granted a coat of arms on 15 September 1933, when it was incorporated as a municipal borough. The arms was: "Azure issuant from the base a sun in splendour on a chief Or a four-barred gate of the first". The crest was: "On a wreath of the colours an oak tree fructed proper pendent therefrom a bugle-horn and a quiver of arrows Or". The supporters were: "On either side a stag each gorged with a chaplet of oak proper pendent therefrom an escutcheon Or charged with a rose gules". The motto was the Latin for: "From the acorn, the oak."

The arms was canting: the sun was said to represent the south, which, together with the gate, made up the name "Southgate". The oak and stags recalled the former oak forests of the area and the red roses indicated that Southgate was in the Duchy of Lancaster.

The arms can still be seen in relief on the façade of a block of flats in Reservoir Road, near Oakwood tube station.

References

External links

Reports and Statistics Southgate & Enfield Borough
British Pathe - "'Ex Glande Quercus' (From Acorn to Oak) Prince George presents Charter of Incorporation of Southgate, London's latest Borough"

Districts abolished by the London Government Act 1963
Districts of England created by the Local Government Act 1894
History of local government in London (1889–1965)
History of the London Borough of Enfield
Municipal boroughs of England
History of local government in Middlesex
Southgate, London